Metro is a 1997 American action comedy film starring Eddie Murphy, Michael Rapaport, Michael Wincott, and Art Evans. It is directed by Thomas Carter, and produced by Roger Birnbaum. The plot follows Scott Roper (Murphy), a hostage negotiator and inspector for the San Francisco Police Department who seeks revenge against a psychotic jewel thief, Michael Korda (Wincott), who murdered Roper's best friend, Lt. Sam Baffert (Evans). Metro was released on January 17, 1997, in the United States, where it grossed $32 million.

Plot
SFPD Inspector Scott Roper is the best hostage negotiator in his department. He is called in to deal with a bank robber, Earl, demanding a getaway vehicle and police escort. He manages to defuse the situation, shooting Earl non-fatally in the shoulder and rescuing his 17 hostages.

That night, Scott accompanies his friend and former partner Sam Baffert to the apartment of Michael Korda, a jewel thief involved in Baffert's investigation. After Sam questions Korda about his involvement, Korda stabs him to death and leaves his corpse inside an elevator for Scott to find. Despite demanding to go after Korda, Captain Frank Solis refuses to let him take the case due to the probable conflict of interest. Scott resolves to bring Korda to justice, but in the meanwhile must adjust to his new partner, SWAT sharpshooter Kevin McCall.

Scott and Kevin are called to a hostage situation at a downtown jewelry store, with Korda as the hostage taker. When Scott and Korda see each other, the latter grabs a hostage and makes a getaway in a truck. Scott and Kevin use Solis' car to pursue him. Korda wrecks the truck, and boards a cable car, shooting the operator. Scott and Kevin manage to stop the cable car and chase Korda into a parking garage, where they apprehend him.

During visitation at the jail with his cousin Clarence Teal, Korda orders Teal to kill Ronnie, Scott's ex-girlfriend, as a way to seek revenge on Scott. Teal attacks Ronnie at her apartment, but Scott intervenes and chases Teal down the fire escape, where, after a chase, Teal is struck and killed by a passing car. An angry Scott visits Korda in jail and warns him to stay away from Ronnie, showing him an autopsy picture of Teal, which enrages Korda.

The next morning, Korda escapes from the jail and kidnaps Ronnie, leading Scott and Kevin into a confrontation at an abandoned shipyard. Korda threatens to kill Ronnie by decapitating her on the cutting machine she is pinned to if Scott does not follow his instructions. Korda charges toward Scott in a sports car, but is shot from a vantage point by Kevin, causing him to swerve and crash through the warehouse entrance. Scott frees Ronnie, while Kevin engages Korda in a shootout where the former is shot in the upper leg. Korda tries to escape in Scott's truck, but Scott fights for control of it. Scott leaps out of the way while Korda, who is unable to escape due to Scott ramming a steel pipe into the door and on the gas pedal continues on, trapped in the truck. As Korda struggles to get the door open, the truck crashes into a stack of explosive barrels and Korda is killed in a massive explosion. The movie ends with Scott and Ronnie relaxing on vacation at a Tahitian beach resort.

Cast
 Eddie Murphy as Inspector Scott Roper
 Michael Rapaport as Inspector Kevin McCall
 Carmen Ejogo as Veronica "Ronnie" Tate
 Michael Wincott as Michael Korda
 Art Evans as Lieutenant Sam Baffett
 Denis Arndt as Captain Frank Solis
 Paul Ben-Victor as Clarence Teal
 Kim Miyori as Inspector Eiko Kimura
 Donal Logue as Earl
 James Carpenter as Officer Forbes

Production
In February 1995 Caravan Pictures bought the script for Metro in a preemptive bid of $1 million. Eddie Murphy entered negotiations for the lead role in May 1995.

Release

Reception
On Rotten Tomatoes, the film has an approval rating of 17% based on reviews from 35 critics.

Roger Ebert gave the film a favorable review; he said "[t]he big action scenes are cleverly staged and Eddie Murphy is back on his game again, with a high-energy performance and crisp dialogue." 
A negative review came from Stephen Holden of The New York Times, who called the film "aimless" and stated that "[t]he vehicular pirouettes and ski jumps are so exaggerated that they correspond neither to the urban geography nor to the laws of physics. And the jiggling camera can't blur the careless mechanical stitching in a sequence that tries to make up for in length what it lacks in inventiveness. After all, when you've seen one spinning car, haven't you seen them all? And hasn't this demolition derby been staged several times before on the same streets with infinitely more pizazz and zest for destruction?" Michael Wilmington agreed, saying "If it weren't for all the jokes [...] the movie might be unintentionally funny," and that "For most of the people who made "Metro," shamelessness is probably a virtue, like good muscle tone. At the end, writer Feldman has actually dreamed up a variation on the old silent movie chestnut, where the mustache-twirling villain has the heroine tied to a sawmill plank. I'm not even sure this scene is intended humorously; the actors and director all milk it dry. And, except for Murphy's rapid-fire badinage, "Metro" has the kind of writing that suggests a mind filled with heroines tied to sawmill planks."

Audiences polled by CinemaScore gave the film an average grade of "B+" on an A+ to F scale.

Box office
The movie debuted with $9.3 million. Metro eventually brought in $32,000,301 domestically, not recovering its $55 million budget.

Director Thomas Carter said that one of the biggest mistakes he made in his career was to make Metro as a rated-R movie. He also blamed the rating for the lukewarm reception.

References

External links

 

1997 films
1997 action films
1990s American films
1990s buddy cop films
1990s English-language films
American buddy cop films
American films about revenge
American police detective films
Caravan Pictures films
Fictional portrayals of the San Francisco Police Department
Films about hostage takings
Films directed by Thomas Carter (director)
Films produced by Roger Birnbaum
Films scored by Steve Porcaro
Films set in San Francisco
Films shot in San Francisco
Touchstone Pictures films